Frederik Backaert (born 13 March 1990 in Ghent) is a Belgian former professional cyclist, who rode professionally between 2014 and 2021, for the  and  teams. In June 2017, he was named in the startlist for the Tour de France.

Major results

2012
 1st Grand Prix de Momignies
 1st Stage 5 Tour de Liège
2013
 1st Overall Trois Jours de Cherbourg
1st Stage 1
 2nd Overall Tour de Liège
1st Stages 2 & 5
 9th Circuit de Wallonie
 10th Grand Prix des Marbriers
2014
 2nd GP Paul Borremans Viane-Geraardsbergen
 4th Internationale Wielertrofee Jong Maar Moedig
2015
 4th Overall Four Days of Dunkirk
 6th Omloop van het Waasland
 7th Tour du Finistère
 10th Overall Tour of Belgium
 10th Internationale Wielertrofee Jong Maar Moedig
2016
 Tour of Austria
1st  Points classification
1st Stage 7
2017
 2nd Tro-Bro Léon
 5th Le Samyn
 5th Tour du Finistère
 7th Overall Giro di Toscana
 8th Bruges Cycling Classic
2018
 9th Overall Tour de Wallonie
 9th Le Samyn
2019
 4th Tour du Finistère
 10th Overall Four Days of Dunkirk
 10th Tro-Bro Léon

Grand Tour general classification results timeline

References

External links

1990 births
Living people
Belgian male cyclists
Sportspeople from Ghent
Cyclists from East Flanders